DCOP may refer to:

 Desktop communication protocol, an inter-process communication (IPC) daemon by KDE used in K Desktop Environment 3
 Distributed constraint optimization, a framework for constraint optimization problems in which each variable may be owned by a different agent
 Deputy Commissioner of Police, a position in some police departments